Graciella Carvalho (born October 31, 1985) is a Brazilian beauty contest winner. She placed second in the Miss Bum Bum Brazil 2011 Beauty Contest, a nationwide contest held since 2011.

References

External links
 

1985 births
Living people